Pegasus Continental Cycling Team was an Indonesian UCI Continental cycling team established in 2014 and disbanded in 2017.

Team roster

Major wins
2014
Stage 3 Le Tour de Filipinas, Rastra Patria Dinawan
Stage 2 Tour de Banyuwangi Ijen, Rastra Patria Dinawan

References

UCI Continental Teams (Asia)
Cycling teams established in 2014
Cycling teams based in Indonesia
2014 establishments in Indonesia
Defunct cycling teams
2017 disestablishments in Indonesia